Carel-Jan Wynand Coetzee (born ) is a South African rugby union player for the  in the Pro14, the  in the Currie Cup and the  in the Rugby Challenge. His regular position is centre.

References

1995 births
Living people
Cheetahs (rugby union) players
Free State Cheetahs players
Griffons (rugby union) players
Rugby union centres
Rugby union players from Bloemfontein
South African rugby union players